Independents for a Europe of Nations was a Eurosceptic political group with seats in the European Parliament between 1996 and 1999.

History
"Group of Independents for a Europe of Nations" was founded on 20 December 1996, succeeding the Europe of Nations group. Following the 1999 European elections, the Group was reorganised into the "Group for a Europe of Democracies and Diversities" on 20 July 1999.

MEPs
MEPs in Independents for a Europe of Nations on 14 December 1998 were as follows:

MEPs in Independents for a Europe of Nations on 4 May 1999 were as follows:

Sources
Konrad-Adenauer-Stiftung
European Parliament
Europe Politique
BBC News

References

Former European Parliament party groups
Euroscepticism